Nally is a surname. Notable people with the surname include:

Derek Nally (born 1936), Irish politician; unsuccessful candidate for president in 1997
Donald Nally (born 1960), American conductor and opera chorus master
Edward Julian Nally (1859–1953), American radio businessman; first president of RCA
Edward Nally (solicitor), English solicitor and academic
Eric Sean Nally, American rock singer
Padraig Nally, Irish farmer; convicted then exonerated of manslaughter
Patrick Nally, British sports marketing businessman
Will Nally (1914–1965), British politician, MP from Wolverhampton

Surnames of Irish origin